KQEH (channel 54), branded on-air as KQED Plus, is a PBS member television station licensed to San Jose, California, United States, serving the San Francisco Bay Area. The station is owned by KQED Inc., alongside fellow PBS station KQED (channel 9) and NPR member KQED-FM (88.5) in San Francisco. The three stations share studios on Mariposa Street in San Francisco's Mission District and transmitter facilities atop Sutro Tower; until January 17, 2018, KQEH's transmitter was located atop Monument Peak.

History

The station first signed on the air on October 19, 1964, as KTEH, originally intended to serve the South Bay. In the late 1990s, KTEH bought KCAH in Watsonville, which was founded in 1989 to serve as the PBS station for the Santa Cruz–Salinas–Monterey market. Before being acquired by KQED, KTEH maintained a Technical Volunteer program, which allowed volunteers to learn how to operate cameras, audio, shading, directing, and other production and technical responsibilities, while minimizing its costs. These volunteers made up the technical crews for all of their pledge drives and auction programming, as well as other occasional live broadcasts.

In 2006, KQED Inc. and the KTEH Foundation agreed to merge to form Northern California Public Broadcasting. As a result of the merger, KCAH changed its call letters to KQET on August 12, 2007. Subsequently, on October 1, 2007, KQET, which became a satellite of KTEH following its acquisition of the station, switched programming sources from KTEH to KQED. KQET's programming is carried on the second digital subchannel of KQED.

In December 2010, the Board of Directors of Northern California Public Broadcasting changed the organization's name to KQED Inc. KTEH shut down its studio on Schallenberger Road, moved its operations to the KQED studio in San Francisco, changed its call letters to KQEH, and rebranded itself as "KQED Plus" on July 1, 2011, after research found that most viewers were unaware that KTEH was related to KQED; other aspects of the station's operation, including programming and staff, were not affected by this change.

KQEH-DT2 
KQED simulcast on KQEH channel 54.2 launched after the merging of KQED and KTEH into Northern California Public Broadcasting.

KQEH-DT3 
KQED Life formerly launched on August 1, 2003, on KQED 9. After the merging of KQED and KTEH into Northern California Public Broadcasting, Life expanded to 54.3 from channel 9.2. On December 15, 2017, KQED Life went permanently off the air and the World channel was moved from 54.5 to 54.3 as a result of KQEH frequencies moving to Sutro Tower.

KQEH-DT4 
KQED Kids launched on August 1, 2003, on KQED 9. After the merging of KQED and KTEH into Northern California Public Broadcasting, Kids expanded to 54.4 from channel 9.4. On January 16, 2017, KQED Kids was replaced by the 24/7 PBS Kids Channel.

KQEH-DT5 
V-me formerly launched in 2007, on KTEH channel 54.5. It aired until January 16, 2017, when it was replaced by the 24/7 PBS Kids Channel which also replaced the KQED Kids local kids station. KQED World launched on August 1, 2003, on KQED 9. On January 16, 2017, World expanded to 54.5 from channel 9.3 following V-me's shutdown. On December 15, 2017, channel 54.5 was permanently shut down and KQED World was moved to channel 54.3.

Programming
In April 1981, KTEH started showing the British science-fantasy show Doctor Who, which ran on the station until January 2003. On April 10, 2007, Doctor Who returned to the station with the airing of the program's 2005 revival. KTEH has also aired another British sci-fi show, Red Dwarf. In 1998, KTEH aired the entire eighth series of Red Dwarf in one night. In doing so, many episodes were shown on KTEH before their broadcast on British television.

In the mid 1990s, Scott Apel hosted airings of The Prisoner with commentary, using an episode ordering he devised. The ordering is still a popular one in the Prisoner fandom, referred to as "KTEH order".

KTEH also has a long history of close ties to the anime fandom. From the early 1990s up until 2003, Sunday night viewers were treated to a selection of anime found nowhere else on United States TV at the time. KTEH was notable as the station that saw the broadcast premiere of the American-subtitled Neon Genesis Evangelion, as well as the dubbed versions of the Tenchi Muyo! Ryo-Ohki and Tenchi Universe TV series. These shows were later shown on Cartoon Network's Toonami programming block. Other anime that have aired on KTEH include, but were not limited to, Bubblegum Crisis, Key the Metal Idol, subtitled versions of Dirty Pair Flash, All Purpose Cultural Cat Girl Nuku Nuku, Urusei Yatsura, Sakura Wars, and Corrector Yui, and dubbed versions of Serial Experiments Lain, City Hunter, Please Save My Earth, Ranma ½, Sailor Moon, Full Metal Panic!, Magic Knight Rayearth, Martian Successor Nadesico, Betterman, Robotech, Mobile Suit Gundam, Cardcaptor Sakura, Astro Boy, Gatchaman, and Samurai Pizza Cats.

Karen Roberts was the person responsible for acquiring the programming for both British television series and Japanese anime.

Local productions

KTEH has produced many television programs over the years, some of which have been nationally broadcast. Its current production schedule includes:
This is Us – an Emmy Award-winning show featuring profiles of remarkable people and places in Northern California.
Saving the Bay – an Emmy Award-winning documentary about San Francisco Bay which went on to a national release in 2011.
video i – an award-winning showcase of documentaries, dramas, and experimental films.
KTEH Cooks with Garlic – local viewers preparing their favorite garlic recipes. Winner of the first PBS Interactive Innovation of the Year Award.
Moneytrack – an ongoing series on investment management.

KTEH was the production company for several other productions:
The War: Nisei Soldiers (2007)
The War: Soldados (2007)
Dave Tatsuno: Movies and Memories (2006)
Cosmopolitan (2003)
Return to the Valley (2003)
Rich Dad, Poor Dad with Robert Kiyosaki (2001)
Adventures with Kanga Roddy (1998)
The First Seven Years (1998)
Cadillac Desert (1997)
The Battle for Mono Lake (1997)
The Men Who Sailed the Liberty Ships (1994)
When Abortion Was Illegal: Untold Stories (1992)
The Day After Trinity (1981)
Tomorrow/Today (1981)
Kaleidoscope (1979)
Fluorocarbons: The Unfinished Agenda (1977)
The Aerosol Factor (1975)

Technical information

Subchannels
The station's digital signal is multiplexed:

Analog-to-digital conversion
KQEH (as KTEH) shut down its analog signal, over UHF channel 54, on June 12, 2009, as part of the federally mandated transition from analog to digital television. The station's digital signal remained on its pre-transition UHF channel 50, using PSIP to display KQEH's virtual channel as 54 on digital television receivers, which was among the high band UHF channels (52-69) that were removed from broadcasting use as a result of the transition. On January 17, 2018, the DTV transmitter for KQEH was turned off, and KQEH programming was shifted to virtual channel 54 broadcast by KQED's digital signal from Sutro Tower.

See also
Cosmopolitan

References

External links

IMDB

PBS member stations
Television channels and stations established in 1964
QEH
KQED Inc.
Television in San Jose, California